The False Prince (German: Der falsche Prinz) is a 1927 German silent film directed by Heinz Paul and starring Harry Domela, Ekkehard Arendt and John Mylong. It was shot at the Johannisthal Studios in Berlin. The film's art direction was by Karl Machus. The film was based on Domela's book recounting his own adventures in post-First World War Germany when he briefly masqueraded as Prince.

Cast
 Harry Domela as Harry Domela 
 Ekkehard Arendt as Baron von Korff, sein Freund 
 John Mylong as Fritz Stein, sein Freund  
 Hans Heinrich von Twardowski as Wolf, sein Freund 
 Hans Mierendorff as Wolfs Vater 
 Mary Kid as Wolfs Schwester 
 Corry Bell as Elizza, ein Flüchtling 
 Adolphe Engers as Frabrikant Müller 
 Else Reval as Seine Frau 
 Alexander Murski as Baron von Raaden 
 Carl Auen as Legationsrat Garry 
 Wilhelm Bendow as Der Hoteldirektor 
 Ferdinand Bonn as Der Intendant 
 Hans Sternberg as Der Bürgermeister 
 Josefine Dora as Seine Frau 
 Maria Forescu   
 Herta Laurin   
 Trude Lehmann   
 Sophie Pagay  
 Lotte Stein  
 Lotte Spira
 Siegfried Berisch   
 Carl Geppert  
 Willy Kaiser-Heyl   
 Hans Leibelt   
 Alfred Loretto   
 Edgar Pauly   
 Paul Rehkopf   
 Fritz Richard   
 Robert Scholz

References

Bibliography
 Hermanni, Horst O. Das Film ABC Band 5: Von La Jana bis Robert Mulligan. Books on Demand, 2011.

External links

1927 films
Films of the Weimar Republic
German silent feature films
Films directed by Heinz Paul
Films set in the 1910s
Films set in Germany
Films about con artists
German black-and-white films
Bavaria Film films
Films shot at Johannisthal Studios